The vibration of plates is a special case of the more general problem of mechanical vibrations.  The equations governing the motion of plates are simpler than those for general three-dimensional objects because one of the dimensions of a plate is much smaller than the other two.  This suggests that a two-dimensional plate theory will give an excellent approximation to the actual three-dimensional motion of a plate-like object, and indeed that is found to be true.

There are several theories that have been developed to describe the motion of plates.  The most commonly used are the Kirchhoff-Love theory and the Uflyand-Mindlin. The latter theory is discussed in detail by Elishakoff. Solutions to the governing equations predicted by these theories can give us insight into the behavior of plate-like objects both under free and forced conditions.  This includes
the propagation of waves and the study of standing waves and vibration modes in plates. The topic of plate vibrations is treated in books by Leissa, Gontkevich, Rao, Soedel, Yu, Gorman and Rao.

Kirchhoff-Love plates

The governing equations for the dynamics of a Kirchhoff-Love plate are

The derivatives in the governing equations are defined as

where the Latin indices go from 1 to 3 while the Greek indices go from 1 to 2. Summation over repeated indices is implied.
For a uniformly thick plate of thickness  and homogeneous mass density

Isotropic Kirchhoff–Love plates

For an isotropic and  homogeneous plate, the stress-strain relations are

The strain-displacement relations
for Kirchhoff-Love plates are

Therefore, the resultant moments corresponding to these stresses are

If we ignore the in-plane displacements , the governing equations reduce to

where  is the bending stiffness of the plate.  For a uniform plate of thickness ,
 
The above equation can also be written in an alternative notation:

In solid mechanics, a plate is often modeled as a two-dimensional elastic body whose potential energy depends on how it is bent from a planar configuration, rather than how it is stretched (which is the instead the case for a membrane such as a drumhead).  In such situations, a vibrating plate can be modeled in a manner analogous to a vibrating drum.  However, the resulting partial differential equation for the vertical displacement w of a plate from its equilibrium position is fourth order, involving the square of the Laplacian of w, rather than second order, and its qualitative behavior is fundamentally different from that of the circular membrane drum.

Free vibrations of isotropic plates
For free vibrations, the external force q is zero, and the governing equation of an isotropic plate reduces to

or

This relation can be derived in an alternative manner by considering the curvature of the plate.  The potential energy density of a plate depends how the plate is deformed, and so on the mean curvature and Gaussian curvature of the plate.  For small deformations, the mean curvature is expressed in terms of w, the vertical displacement of the plate from kinetic equilibrium, as Δw, the Laplacian of w, and the Gaussian curvature is the Monge–Ampère operator wxxwyy−w.  The total potential energy of a plate Ω therefore has the form

apart from an overall inessential normalization constant.  Here μ is a constant depending on the properties of the material.

The kinetic energy is given by an integral of the form

Hamilton's principle asserts that w is a stationary point with respect to variations of the total energy T+U.  The resulting partial differential equation is

Circular plates
For freely vibrating circular plates, and the Laplacian in cylindrical coordinates has the form

Therefore, the governing equation for free vibrations of a circular plate of thickness  is

Expanded out,

To solve this equation we use the idea of separation of variables and assume a solution of the form

Plugging this assumed solution into the governing equation gives us

The solution of the right hand equation is

The left hand side equation can be written as

where .  The general solution of this eigenvalue problem that is
appropriate for plates has the form

For a plate of radius  with a clamped circumference, the boundary conditions are

From these boundary conditions we find that

We can also express the displacement in the form

For a given frequency  the first term inside the sum in the above equation gives the mode shape.  We can find the value

Rectangular plates

Consider a rectangular plate which has dimensions  in the -plane and thickness  in the -direction.  We seek to find the free vibration modes of the plate.

Assume a displacement field of the form

Then,

and

Plugging these into the governing equation gives

From the right hand side, we then have

From the left hand side,

where

Since the above equation is a biharmonic eigenvalue problem, we look for Fourier expansion
solutions of the form

We can check and see that this solution satisfies the boundary conditions for a freely vibrating
rectangular plate with simply supported edges:

Plugging the solution into the biharmonic equation gives us

Comparison with the previous expression for  indicates that we can have an infinite
number of solutions with

Therefore the general solution for the plate equation is

For example, if

we get,

References

See also
Bending
Bending of plates
Chladni figures
Infinitesimal strain theory
Kirchhoff–Love plate theory
Linear elasticity
Mindlin–Reissner plate theory
Plate theory
Stress (mechanics)
Stress resultants
Structural acoustics

Continuum mechanics
Mechanical vibrations